Marta Linares García (born 31 January 1986 in Castellón de la Plana) is a Spanish group rhythmic gymnast representing her nation at international competitions. She is the current coach of the Spanish Individual National Team in Madrid. 

She participated at the 2004 Summer Olympics, in the group all-around event, together with Sonia Abejón, Bárbara González, Isabel Pagán, Carolina Rodríguez and Nuria Velasco finishing 7th in the final after finishing 8th in the qualification.
She competed at world championships, including at the 2005 World Rhythmic Gymnastics Championships.

References

External links
 bbc
 
 database.fig-gymnastics.com
spanishrg.tripod.com
youtube.com

1986 births
Living people
Spanish rhythmic gymnasts
Sportspeople from Castellón de la Plana
Olympic gymnasts of Spain
Gymnasts at the 2004 Summer Olympics